Catabbio is a village in Tuscany, central Italy, administratively a frazione of the comune of Semproniano, province of Grosseto. At the time of the 2001 census its population amounted to 203.

Geography 
Catabbio is about 65 km from Grosseto and 5 km from Semproniano, and it is situated along the Provincial Road which links Montemerano to Sovana. The village is divided into four hamlets: Casa Rigo, Santarello, Scalabrelli and Verziliani.

Main sights 
 Church of Sant'Anna, main parish church of the village, it is situated in the square of the main hamlet of Santarello.
 Church of Santa Lucia, little church in the hamlet of Scalabrelli, it contains a Renaissance stoup of 1574.
 Castle of Catabbio, old castle built by the Aldobrandeschi in the 12th century, it's now in ruins.

References

Bibliography 
 Aldo Mazzolai, Guida della Maremma. Percorsi tra arte e natura, Florence, Le Lettere, 1997.
 Giuseppe Guerrini, Torri e castelli della provincia di Grosseto, Siena, Nuova Immagine Editrice, 1999.

See also 
 Cellena
 Petricci
 Rocchette di Fazio
 Semproniano

Frazioni of Semproniano